Hugh Hardy (July 26, 1932 – March 17, 2017) was an American architect, known for designing and revitalizing theaters, performing arts venues, public spaces, and cultural facilities across the United States.

The New Yorker writer Brendan Gill called him "the Stanford White of our fin de siècle". In 1995, Julie Iovine of The New York Times wrote, "There is scarcely a cultural icon in the city with which Mr. Hardy has not been involved."

Biography
Hugh Gelston Hardy was born on July 26, 1932, in Majorca, Spain, to Gelston Hardy and the former Barbara Bonestell Walton. His father, who worked for Young & Rubicam advertising agency, had traveled to Spain to write a novel. The family soon returned to New York, dividing their time between Manhattan and Irvington-on-Hudson.

Hardy graduated from the Deerfield Academy in 1950. He then attended his father's alma mater, Princeton University, where he earned a Bachelor of Architecture in 1954 and a Master of Fine Arts in Architecture in 1956. After serving as a drafting instructor in the United States Army Corps of Engineers, he began working with the theatrical set and lighting designer Jo Mielziner in New York. One of his first projects was the  Vivian Beaumont Theater, designed by Eero Saarinen; he painted a hotel-room set for the original stage production of the musical Gypsy. Hardy joined Local 829 of the United Scenic Artists in 1958. 

Over the course of his career, Hardy founded three firms: Hugh Hardy & Associates in 1962, Hardy Holzman Pfeiffer Associates in 1967, and H3 Hardy Collaboration Architecture in 2004. Hardy Holzman Pfeiffer received the Architecture Firm Award in 1981, the highest honor bestowed on a firm by American Institute of Architects for distinguished work. Hardy was also a Fellow of the American Institute of Architects.

He was named a member of the American Academy of Arts and Letters in 1993.  He won the Placemark Award from the Design History Foundation (2001), the AIA New York Chapter's President's Award (2002), the General Services Administration Commissioner's Award for Excellence in Public Architecture, the Architectural League of New York's President's Medal (2010), and the Historic Districts Council's Landmarks Lion award (2013). In 1981, he was elected into the National Academy of Design as an associate member; he became a full academician in 1994. In 2010, Hardy was one of 52 leading architects invited to participate in Vanity Fair's 2010 World Architecture Survey.

Personal life
Hardy married the architect Tiziana Spadea in 1965. They had two children.

Work
Select examples of his firm's work include:

Radio City Music Hall renovation, Manhattan, New York
Brooklyn Academy of Music, Brooklyn, New York
Rizzoli Bookstore, Manhattan, New York
Theatre for a New Audience, Brooklyn, New York
LCT3 / Claire Tow Theater, Lincoln Center Theater, Manhattan, New York
New Amsterdam Theatre, Manhattan, New York
New Victory Theater, Manhattan, New York
Theater Row, Manhattan, New York
Bridgemarket (an area of the Queensboro Bridge), Manhattan, New York
Bryant Park kiosks, café and grill, Manhattan, New York
Herald and Greeley Square Park kiosks, Manhattan, New York
Whitaker Center for Science and the Arts, Harrisburg, Pennsylvania
Joyce Theater, Manhattan, New York
Rainbow Room renovation, Manhattan, New York
18 West 11th Street, Manhattan, New York
Windows on the World renovation, Manhattan, New York (destroyed September 11, 2001)
Alice Busch Opera Theater, Glimmerglass Festival, Cooperstown, New York
Casa 74, also known as 255 East 74th Street, Upper East Side, Manhattan, New York (with SLCE Architects)
Native Plant Garden pavilions (2013), Leon Levy Visitor Center (2004), Arthur and Janet Ross Lecture Hall revitalization (1993); The New York Botanical Garden, Bronx, New York

See also

 List of American architects
 List of Deerfield alumni
 Malcolm Holzman
 List of people from New York City
 List of Princeton University people

References

External links

 H3 Hardy Collaboration Architecture, the architectural studio of Hugh Hardy
 
 

1932 births
2017 deaths
20th-century American architects
21st-century American architects
Architects from New York City
Deerfield Academy alumni
Members of the American Academy of Arts and Letters
New Classical architects
People from Manhattan
Princeton University School of Architecture alumni
United States Army Corps of Engineers personnel
Fellows of the American Institute of Architects